The Poland national speedway team is the national motorcycle speedway team of Poland and is controlled by the Polish Motor Union (PZM). The team is one of the major teams in international speedway and they won the Team World Championship nine times (last time in 2009 and 2010). The team has won 1971 Speedway World Pairs Championship also. After their win in the 2009 and 2010 Speedway World Cup, Poland's speedway team was awarded the Team of the Year in Poland by Przegląd Sportowy in 2009 and 2010.

2016 Team 
A members of 2016 Team was approval on January 30, 2016 by Main Commission for Speedway Sport (Główna Komisja Sportu Żużlowego, GKSŻ) which is a part of the Polish Motor Union (Polski Związek Motorowy, PZM).

Senior Team
 Krzysztof Buczkowski
 Patryk Dudek
 Tomasz Gollob
 Jarosław Hampel
 Maciej Janowski
 Krzysztof Kasprzak
 Janusz Kołodziej
 Piotr Pawlicki
 Przemysław Pawlicki
 Piotr Protasiewicz
 Grzegorz Zengota

Junior Team
 Adrian Cyfer
 Maksym Drabik
 Rafał Karczmarz
 Marcin Nowak
 Bartosz Smektała
 Krystian Pieszczek
 Paweł Przedpełski
 Kacper Woryna
 Bartosz Zmarzlik

Honours

World Championships

European Championships

World Championship

Team 
The Poland national speedway team were a major force in the opening years of the tournament, rivalling Sweden to win 3 out of the opening 7 championships in the early 60s. They are currently one of the best teams in the world having won in 2005 and 2007. Key riding members of the title wins include Tomasz Gollob, Andrzej Wyglenda and Andrzej Pogorzelski who all managed 3 world cup wins.

Speedway World Team Cup (1961-2000)

Speedway World Cup (since 2001)

European Championship

Pairs

World Champions from Poland

Famous Polish riders 

 Tomasz Gollob
 Jarosław Hampel
 Rune Holta
 Edward Jancarz
 Krzysztof Kasprzak
 Zenon Plech
 Andrzej Pogorzelski
 Piotr Protasiewicz
 Jerzy Szczakiel
 Paweł Waloszek
 Antoni Woryna
 Andrzej Wyglenda

See also 
Speedway in Poland

References

External links 
List of members of Polish national team

National speedway teams
Speedway

!